The 2000 Football Tasmania SWL premiership season was an Australian rules football competition, staged across Tasmania, Australia over seventeen roster rounds and four finals series matches between 24 March and 9 September 2000.
This was the fifteenth and final season of statewide football and was the third separate statewide competition in three years after the TSFL was abandoned in favour of starting up a new statewide league known simply as the SWL which detailed six clubs from the six highest populated cities across Tasmania.
The SWL was sponsored to the tune of A$750,000 under a funding agreement with the Australian Football League which was overseen and managed by the sport's governing body in the state (Football Tasmania) to control.

Shortly after the season had been completed, Burnie Dockers announced that they would be leaving the competition to rejoin the NTFL in 2001, a short time later both Northern Bombers and Devonport followed suit leaving an unsustainable three club statewide competition, with Football Tasmania also under considerable pressure from both the Hobart City Council over possible legal action against them for breaking a contract by moving the Grand Final away from North Hobart Oval to York Park this season and looming legal threats by the remaining SWL clubs over a restraint of trade, the statewide competition was abandoned by Football Tasmania in January 2001, the remaining clubs resumed playing league matches in their regional areas in both the SFL and the NTFL until the end of the 2008 season.

Participating Clubs
Burnie Dockers Football Club
Clarence District Football Club
Devonport Power Football Club
Glenorchy District Football Club
Hobart Demons Football Club
Northern Bombers Football Club

2000 SWL Club Coaches
Mick McGuane (Burnie Dockers)
Grant Fagan (Clarence)
Dale Perry (Devonport Power)
Shayne Stevenson (Glenorchy)
Darren Trevena (Hobart Demons)
Garry McIntosh (Northern Bombers)

SWL Under-21s Grand Final
Clarence 9.13 (67) v Northern Bombers 8.14 (62) – York Park

SWL Under-18s Grand Final
Glenorchy (A) 13.9 (87) v Hobart Demons (B) 4.3 (27) – York Park

Leading Goalkickers: SWL
Scott Allen (Clarence) – 80

Medal Winners
Nathan Howard (Northern Bombers) – William Leitch Medal
Scott Allen (Clarence) – Darrel Baldock Medal (Best player in SWL Grand Final)
Justin Cotton (Northern Bombers) & Heath Fox (Northern Bombers) – George Watt Medal (U-21s)
Jamie Walker (Glenorchy) – V.A Geard Medal (Under-18s)

Intrastate Matches
Intrastate Match (Saturday, 10 June 2000)
South 16.13 (109) v North 9.9 (63) – Att: 2,302 at York Park

2000 SWL Ladder

Round 1
(Friday, 24 March & Saturday, 1 April 2000)
Hobart Demons 5.12 (42) v Clarence 3.13 (31) – Att: 1,628 at North Hobart Oval (Friday Night)
Northern Bombers 17.10 (112) v Glenorchy 13.18 (96) – Att: 1,343 at KGV Football Park (Saturday)
Burnie Dockers 14.20 (104) v Devonport 1.4 (10) – Att: 1,930 at West Park Oval (Saturday)

Round 2
(Saturday, 8 April 2000)
Northern Bombers 21.10 (136) v Hobart Demons 7.10 (52) – Att: 929 at North Hobart Oval
Clarence 15.13 (103) v Burnie Dockers 12.5 (77) – Att: 1,067 at Bellerive Oval
Glenorchy 28.19 (187) v Devonport 5.6 (36) – Att: 636 at Devonport Oval

Round 3
(Saturday, 15 April & Sunday, 16 April 2000)
Clarence 20.10 (130) v Glenorchy 14.15 (99) – Att: 1,418 at Bellerive Oval
Burnie Dockers 13.7 (85) v Hobart Demons 5.13 (43) – Att: 1,215 at West Park Oval (Night)
Northern Bombers 19.22 (136) v Devonport 2.4 (16) – Att: 804 at Devonport Oval (Sunday)

Round 4
(Saturday, 29 April & Sunday, 30 April 2000)
Clarence 21.13 (139) v Hobart Demons 7.8 (50) – Att: 1,056 at North Hobart Oval
Northern Bombers 10.12 (72) v Glenorchy 6.4 (40) – Att: 1,184 at KGV Football Park
Burnie Dockers 22.17 (149) v Devonport 4.12 (36) – Att: 1,035 at West Park Oval (Sunday)

Round 5
(Saturday, 6 May & Sunday, 7 May 2000)
Hobart Demons 23.10 (148) v Devonport 8.9 (57) – Att: 633 at North Hobart Oval
Burnie Dockers 13.12 (90) v Glenorchy 9.12 (66) – Att: 869 at KGV Football Park
Clarence 19.12 (126) v Northern Bombers 8.15 (63) – Att: 1,406 at Bellerive Oval (Sunday)

Round 6
(Saturday, 13 May & Sunday, 14 May 2000)
Glenorchy 15.17 (107) v Hobart Demons 8.6 (54) – Att: 1,274 at KGV Football Park
Clarence 17.14 (116) v Devonport 6.3 (39) – Att: 614 at Devonport Oval
Northern Bombers 11.11 (77) v Burnie Dockers 5.14 (44) – Att: 1,010 at West Park Oval (Sunday)

Round 7
(Saturday, 20 May & Sunday, 21 May 2000)
Hobart Demons 20.12 (132) v Burnie Dockers 13.6 (84) – Att: 703 at North Hobart Oval
Glenorchy 13.20 (98) v Devonport 5.11 (41) – Att: 675 at Devonport Oval
Northern Bombers 14.14 (98) v Clarence 13.7 (85) – Att: 3,417 at York Park (Sunday)

Round 8
(Saturday, 27 May & Sunday, 23 July 2000)
Clarence 18.18 (126) v Hobart Demons 9.10 (64) – Att: 1,053 at Bellerive Oval
Northern Bombers 18.10 (118) v Glenorchy 10.10 (70) – Att: 1,108 at York Park
Burnie Dockers 15.16 (106) v Devonport 4.9 (33) – Att: 1,026 at Devonport Oval (Sunday, 23 July) *
Note: This match was moved forward to be played on 23 July on the weekend of Round 14 for unspecified reasons.

Round 9
(Saturday, 3 June 2000)
Hobart Demons 15.11 (101) v Glenorchy 14.7 (91) – Att: 985 at KGV Football Park
Northern Bombers 18.15 (123) v Devonport 10.7 (67) – Att: 521 at Devonport Oval
Burnie Dockers 14.15 (99) v Clarence 5.14 (44) – Att: 1,075 at West Park Oval

Round 10
(Saturday, 17 June 2000)
Clarence 15.15 (105) v Glenorchy 9.9 (63) – Att: 1,139 at Bellerive Oval
Northern Bombers 14.20 (104) v Burnie Dockers 4.8 (32) – Att: 1,169 at York Park
Hobart Demons 22.13 (145) v Devonport 8.10 (58) – Att: 641 at Devonport Oval

Round 11
(Saturday, 24 June 2000)
Hobart Demons 9.24 (78) v Glenorchy 10.10 (70) – Att: 892 at North Hobart Oval
Clarence 34.9 (213) v Devonport 7.8 (50) – Att: 613 at Bellerive Oval
Northern Bombers 12.15 (87) v Burnie Dockers 6.11 (47) – Att: 1,039 at West Park Oval

Round 12
(Saturday, 1 July 2000)
Clarence 21.19 (145) v Glenorchy 5.13 (43) – Att: 998 at KGV Football Park
Northern Bombers 20.17 (137) v Hobart Demons 6.9 (45) – Att: 854 at York Park
Burnie Dockers 23.14 (152) v Devonport 6.4 (40) – Att: 766 at Devonport Oval

Round 13
(Saturday, 8 July 2000)
Hobart Demons 17.15 (117) v Devonport 10.5 (65) – Att: 515 at North Hobart Oval
Northern Bombers 15.9 (99) v Clarence 11.7 (73) – Att: 1,039 at York Park
Burnie Dockers 25.15 (165) v Glenorchy 7.8 (50) – Att: 774 at West Park Oval

Round 14
(Saturday, 15 July, Sunday, 16 July & Saturday, 22 July 2000)
Glenorchy 24.16 (160) v Devonport 5.6 (36) – Att: 904 at KGV Football Park (15 July)
Burnie Dockers 17.11 (113) v Hobart Demons 8.13 (61) – Att: 562 at North Hobart Oval (16 July)
Clarence 12.8 (80) v Northern Bombers 6.10 (46) – Att: 5,625 at York Park (22 July - Night) *
Note: This match set the all-time Statewide League attendance record.

Round 15
(Saturday, 29 July & Sunday 30 July 2000)
Glenorchy 12.18 (90) v Hobart Demons 11.5 (71) – Att: 1,002 at North Hobart Oval
Clarence 21.9 (135) v Burnie Dockers 7.8 (50) – Att: 1,205 at West Park Oval
Northern Bombers 29.14 (188) v Devonport 6.10 (46) – Att: 1,552 at York Park (Sunday)

Round 16
(Saturday, 5 August 2000)
Clarence 32.17 (209) v Hobart Demons 3.8 (26) – Att: 1,210 at Bellerive Oval
Burnie Dockers 15.12 (102) v Devonport 6.6 (42) – Att: 809 at West Park Oval
Northern Bombers 17.10 (112) v Glenorchy 10.15 (75) – Att: 2,210 at York Park (Night)

Round 17
(Saturday, 12 August 2000)
Clarence 17.14 (116) v Glenorchy 8.6 (54) – Att: 876 at KGV Football Park
Hobart Demons 15.14 (104) v Devonport 6.12 (48) – Att: 459 at Devonport Oval
Northern Bombers 14.11 (95) v Burnie Dockers 7.5 (47) – Att: 3,165 at York Park (Night)

First Semi Final
(Saturday, 19 August 2000)
Hobart Demons: 1.3 (9) | 6.7 (43) | 9.8 (62) | 17.9 (111)
Burnie Dockers: 6.4 (40) | 7.6 (48) | 10.7 (67) | 11.9 (75)
Attendance: 1,037 at West Park Oval

Second Semi Final
(Saturday, 26 August 2000)
Clarence: 4.1 (25) | 10.5 (65) | 17.10 (112) | 21.10 (136)
Northern Bombers: 3.3 (21) | 5.6 (36) | 9.7 (61) | 14.10 (94)
Attendance: 3,669 at York Park

Preliminary Final
(Sunday, 2 September 2000)
Northern Bombers: 3.7 (25) | 8.8 (56) | 14.12 (96) | 21.17 (143)
Hobart Demons: 4.1 (25) | 8.2 (50) | 10.2 (62) | 11.2 (68)
Attendance: 1,580 at North Hobart Oval

Grand Final
(Sunday, 9 September 2000)
Clarence: 4.0 (24) | 6.6 (42) | 8.13 (61) | 15.15 (105)
Northern Bombers: 1.4 (10) | 2.7 (19) | 4.7 (31) | 8.8 (56)
Attendance: 6,124 at York Park

Source: All scores and statistics courtesy of the Hobart Mercury, Launceston Examiner and North West Advocate publications.

External links
Youtube - 2000 SWL television advertisement

Tasmanian Football League seasons
2000 in Australian rules football